Daniel Axford (born 1975) is an English racing cyclist from Winchester.

Axford attended Oxford University and enjoyed some success in BUSA cycling events whilst at university.

Palmarès

1993
1st Junior Tour of Wales

1998
3rd Tour of the Cotswolds
3rd Tour of the Peak, Premier Calendar event

1999
3rd Havant International GP, Premier Calendar event

2003
4th Havant International GP, Premier Calendar event
1st Points competition

2009
1st British National Masters Road Race Championships (30-35 yrs)
1st British National Masters Time Trial Championships (30-35 yrs)

2007
1st National Hill Climb Championships - Team (Arctic Shorter Rochford RT - J Dobbin, D Axford, P Bissell)

References

External links

1975 births
Living people
English male cyclists
Alumni of the University of Oxford
Sportspeople from Winchester